The Hunt River is a river in the U.S. state of Rhode Island. It flows approximately 11 km (7 mi). There is a small stone dam just upstream from the Davisville Road bridge that powered a woolen mill active in the period 1811–1924.

Course
The river is formed in East Greenwich by the confluence of Scrabbletown Brook and an unnamed stream. From there, the river flows north along Rhode Island State Route 4, then northeast to Potowomut Pond. Below the pond, the river flows southeast to Potowomut Peninsula where the river widens and becomes known as the Potowomut River.

Most of the Hunt River forms the boundary between Kent and Washington Counties, also separating East Greenwich and Warwick from North Kingstown.

Crossings
Below is a list of all crossings over the Hunt River. The list starts at the headwaters and goes downstream.
East Greenwich
South Road
North Kingstown
Davisville Road (RI 403)
Frenchtown Road (RI 402)
Post Road (U.S. 1)
Austin Road
Potowomut Road

Tributaries
The Hunt River has two named tributaries, Frenchtown Brook and Fry Brook. It also has many unnamed streams that also feed it.

See also
List of rivers in Rhode Island

References
Maps from the United States Geological Survey

Rivers of Kent County, Rhode Island
Rivers of Washington County, Rhode Island
North Kingstown, Rhode Island
East Greenwich, Rhode Island
Rivers of Rhode Island